Viraj Pushpakumara (born 18 May 1987) is a Sri Lankan cricketer. He made his first-class debut for Colts Cricket Club in the 2010–11 Premier Trophy on 18 February 2011.

References

External links
 

1987 births
Living people
Sri Lankan cricketers
Colts Cricket Club cricketers
Sri Lanka Army Sports Club cricketers
People from Southern Province, Sri Lanka